Melville Hammond Long (October 18, 1889 – May 1969) of San Francisco, California, was an American tennis player.

Biography
He was born on October 18, 1889 in San Francisco, California. He attended University of California, Berkeley and received a medical degree, and by 1918 was a physician and surgeon. 

He won the men's singles competition at the Pacific Coast Championships (now known as the SAP Open) three times, in 1906, 1908 and 1910.

Long died in 1969.

References

American male tennis players
Tennis players from San Francisco
1889 births
1969 deaths